is a Japanese computer game magazine, first published in 1983, by Kadokawa Shoten. The name "Comptiq" came from combining the words "computer" and "boutique". Originally a PC magazine, its focus shifted from computers to computer games. As of September 2003, it was known as a "MediaMix Game Magazine". The magazine is sold every month on the tenth.

The magazine is split into two sections: one with information about games, and one with manga information (usually made after popular H-games). It's also known for revealing information on upcoming games and includes a gift in each issue. However, unlike most game magazines, Comptiq does not publish game reviews.

Serialized manga
.hack//GU+
.hack//Legend of the Twilight
Air
D.C.: Da Capo
D.C.S.G.: Da Capo Second Graduation
Kishinhoukou Demonbane
Eden's Bowy
Eureka Seven: Gravity Boys & Lifting Girls
Fate/Extra
Fate/stay night
Fortune Arterial
Gunbuster
Hero Legend
HoneyComing
Izumo 2
Kakyuu Sei
Kantai Collection
Listis
Little Busters!
Lucky Star
Moon Quest
Nichijou
Phantom Brave
Record of Lodoss War (role-playing game replay) 
Romancia
Rune Wars
Shuffle! Days in the Bloom
Snow: Pure White
Tōka Gettan
The Tower of Druaga: the Aegis of Uruk Sekigan no Ryū
Vagrants
Yami to Bōshi to Hon no Tabibito
Yoake Mae yori Ruriiro na
Ys

References

External links
Official website 

Monthly manga magazines published in Japan
Video game magazines published in Japan
Magazines established in 1983
1983 establishments in Japan
Kadokawa Shoten magazines
Magazines published in Tokyo